Mels railway station is a railway station in Mels, in the Swiss canton of St. Gallen. It is an intermediate stop on the Ziegelbrücke–Sargans line.

Services 
Mels is served by the S4 of the St. Gallen S-Bahn:

 : hourly service via St. Gallen (circular operation).

Layout and connections 
Mels has a single -long island platform with two tracks ( 3–4). There is a non-passenger side platform located on the south side of the station.  operates bus services from the station to Mels and Sargans.

References

External links 
 
 

Railway stations in the canton of St. Gallen
Swiss Federal Railways stations